A sucker punch is a blow made without warning.

Sucker Punch or suckerpunch may also refer to:

Books
 Sucker Punch (play), a 2010 play by the British playwright Roy Williams

Film and TV
 Sucker Punch (2008 film), a film featuring Gordon Alexander and Antonio Fargas
 Sucker Punch (2011 film), an action-fantasy film featuring Emily Browning
 "Sucker Punch" (Castle), an episode of the TV series Castle
 "Sucker Punch", an episode of the TV series Suits

Music 
 Suckapunch Records, an independent record label based in Lincoln, Nebraska, USA

Albums 
 Sucker Punch (Haji's Kitchen album), 2001
 Sucker Punch (soundtrack), soundtrack album for the 2011 film
 Sucker Punch (Sigrid album), 2019
 The Sucker Punch Show, the third full-length album released by indie rock band Lovedrug
 Suckapunch (album), a 2021 album by You Me at Six
 Suckerpunch (Maggie Lindemann album), 2022
 Suckerpunch, 2022 album by Chloe Moriondo

Songs 
 "Sucker Punch" (song), a 2018 single by Sigrid
 "Sucker Punch", a song by OneRepublic from Waking Up
 "Sucker Punch", a song by Savage Republic from Customs
 "Suckerpunch", a song by Bowling for Soup from Let's Do It for Johnny!
 "Suckerpunch", a song by Delain from Moonbathers
 "Suckerpunch", a song by Five Iron Frenzy from Our Newest Album Ever!
 "Suckerpunch", a song by the Mayfield Four from Fallout
 "Suckerpunch", a single by the Wildhearts taken from Earth vs the Wildhearts

Gaming
 Sucker Punch Productions, an American video game developer

See also
 Sucker (disambiguation)
 Punch (disambiguation)